Victor "Vicky" Byarugaba (born 17 November 1954) is a Ugandan boxer. He competed in the men's light middleweight event at the 1984 Summer Olympics.

References

External links
 

1954 births
Living people
Ugandan male boxers
Olympic boxers of Uganda
Boxers at the 1984 Summer Olympics
Place of birth missing (living people)
Light-middleweight boxers